Melinda Széky-Sztrémi (née Sztrémi; born 16 March 1958) is a Hungarian educator and politician, mayor of Salgótarján from 2006 to 2014 and also a member of the National Assembly (MP) for Salgótarján (Nógrád County Constituency I) between 2010 and 2014.

References

1958 births
Living people
Hungarian educators
Hungarian women educators
Mayors of places in Hungary
Fidesz politicians
Members of the National Assembly of Hungary (2010–2014)
Women members of the National Assembly of Hungary
People from Balassagyarmat
21st-century Hungarian women politicians